Slivata is a village in Northwestern Bulgaria. It is located in Lom Municipality, Montana Province.

References

Villages in Montana Province